Delrouval or Cybele Delrouval is a modern French red cultivar of domesticated apple, developed by the Delbard nursery breeders, by combining the Delbarestivale and Akane apples.

References

External links
Use of genetic resources and partial resistances for apple breeding

Delbard breeds
Apple cultivars
French apples